MCBI can refer to:
Minnesota Christian Broadcasters
MetroCorp Bancshares (Nasdaq: MCBI)